Ishrat Afreen (alternative spelling: Ishrat Aafreen; born 25 December 1956)  is an Urdu poet. Her works have been translated in many languages including English, Japanese, Sanskrit and Hindi. The ghazal singers Jagjit Singh & Chitra Singh also performed her poetry in their anthology, Beyond Time (1987). Zia Mohyeddin also recites her nazms in his 17th and 20th volumes as well as his ongoing concerts.

Early life and career 

She was first published at the age of 14 in the Daily Jang on 31 April 1971.
She continued writing and was published in a multitude of literary magazines across India and Pakistan. She eventually became assistant editor for the monthly magazine Awaaz, edited by the poet Fahmida Riaz. Parallel to her writing career she participated in several radio shows on Radio Pakistan from 1970–1984 that aired nationally and globally. She later worked under Mirza Jamil on the now universal Noori Nastaliq Urdu script for InPage.

Ishrat Afreen is currently the Principal Urdu Lecturer for The University of Texas at Austin's Hindu Urdu Flagship Program.

Education 
Afreen pursued her undergraduate education at the Allama Iqbal Govt College Karachi and later received her master's degree in Urdu Literature from the University of Karachi, Pakistan. She also taught at the Aga Khan School and boardinghouse.

Publications 
Afreen has published two collections of poetry entitled Kunj Peeleh Poolon Ka (1985) and Dhoop Apne Hisse Ki (2005).  Amongst others, she has been included in the prestigious anthology We Sinful Women and inspired the well-known anthology Beyond Belief: Contemporary Feminist Urdu Poetry.

References

External links 
Official site
Urdu Study at University of Wisconsin
BBC: 2005's Most Important Urdu Publications
DAWN Book Review of "Dhoop Apney Hissay Ki"
Article in Urdu
DAWN Interview Article
Initial DAWN Article 1 
Article on Launching of "Dhoop Apne Hissay Ki"
Image of Newspaper Spread in Urdu 

1956 births
Living people
Urdu-language poets from Pakistan
Muhajir people
Pakistani feminist writers
Pakistani women's rights activists
Writers from Houston
University of Karachi alumni
Writers from Karachi
Pakistani emigrants to the United States
Pakistani women writers